The Sheffield & Hallamshire Women & Girls League is a women's association football league in England run by the Sheffield & Hallamshire FA.

The league is at levels 7 to 9 of the women's league pyramid, and promotes to the North East Regional Women's Football League.

Current member clubs (2022–23)

Division One
AFC Bentley
Barnsley Women development
Chesterfield Youth
Kiveton Park
Middlewood Rovers
Rotherham United Whitehill
Sheffield Wednesday reserves
Socrates
Wakefield reserves

Division Two
Dronfield Town reserves
Handsworth development
Mexborough Athletic
Mosborough
Penistone Church
Sheffield City
Sheffield United Community Foundation development
Swallownest
Worsbrough Bridge Athletic

Division Three
AFC Norton Woodseats
Charnock Ridgeway
Dearne & District
Eckington Belles
Kiveton Park reserves
Mind Over Matter
Staveley Miners Welfare
West End Terriers
Wickersley Youth

Champions

See also
 Sheffield & Hallamshire Women's Challenge Cup

References

External links
FA Full-time site

7
Football in South Yorkshire